Come Unto Down (a.k.a. Come Down to a Lower Place) is a 1982 South Korean drama film directed by Lee Jang-ho, and based on the novel of the same title by Lee Cheong-jun. It was awarded Best Film at the Grand Bell Awards ceremony, and given the film award at the Baeksang Arts Awards.

Synopsis
Yo-han is the son of a Christian minister. Following his father's career, he joins the seminary without much enthusiasm, then drops out. After doing his military service as a KATUSA, he teaches at the U.S. educational center. When he is given a job teaching in America, he hastily marries in preparation for the move. He is suddenly struck blind, then begins contemplating suicide. Instead he has a religious vision and dedicates himself to the ministry, and opens a church for the blind.

Cast
 Lee Yeong-ho: Ahn Yo-han
 Shin Seong-il: Ahn Shin-sam
 Na Young-hee: Kang Eun-gyeong
 Ahn Sung-ki: Teacher Song
 Park Jung-ja: Mother
 Park Jae-ho: Jin-yong
 Cheon Dong-seok: Bang Ul-i
 Bok Hye-suk: Grandmother
 Kim Ji-young: Mother-in-law
 Moon Tai-sun: Rev. Kim

Bibliography

English

Korean

References

1982 films
1982 drama films
South Korean drama films
Films about evangelicalism
Films based on Korean novels
Best Picture Grand Bell Award winners
1980s Korean-language films
Films directed by Lee Jang-ho